Charles Gordon Edwards (July 2, 1878 – July 13, 1931) was an American political figure from the state of Georgia.

Early years and education
Edwards was born in Daisy, Georgia in 1878 and attended the Gordon Institute in Barnesville, Georgia and Florida State College in Lake City (now the University of Florida). He then studied law at the University of Georgia School of Law, was a member of the Phi Kappa Literary Society and graduated with a Bachelor of Laws (LL.B.) degree in 1898, gained admission to the state bar and began the practice of law in Reidsville, Georgia.

After moving to Savannah, Georgia in 1900, Edwards joined the Savannah Volunteer Guards, Company B, Coast Artillery, and served as a sergeant in 1902 and 1903 and as a second lieutenant in the Oglethorpe Light Infantry of the First Georgia Regiment of Infantry in 1903 and 1904.

Politics
In 1906, Edwards was elected to the 60th United States Congress as a Democratic member of the United States House of Representatives and served four additional terms in that seat until declining to run for re-election in 1916.

Legal career and return to office
After his initial congressional service, Edwards returned to Savannah to practice law. He also served as president of the Savannah Board of Trade in 1919 and 1920, trustee of Southern Methodist College in McRae, Georgia, served on the Savannah Harbor Commission from 1920 until 1924 and was director of the Atlantic Deep Waterways Association.

Edwards returned to the U.S. Congress as a Representative in the 69th Congress and served three additional terms until his 1931 death from a heart attack in Atlanta, Georgia while still in office. He was buried in Savannah's Bonaventure Cemetery.

See also
List of United States Congress members who died in office (1900–49)

References

History of the University of Georgia, Thomas Walter Reed,  Imprint:  Athens, Georgia : University of Georgia, ca. 1949, pp.1748-1749

1878 births
1931 deaths
Georgia (U.S. state) lawyers
University of Georgia alumni
Burials in Georgia (U.S. state)
People from Evans County, Georgia
People from Reidsville, Georgia
Politicians from Savannah, Georgia
Democratic Party members of the United States House of Representatives from Georgia (U.S. state)